The Governorate of New Castile (Gobernación de Nueva Castilla) was the gubernatorial region administered to Francisco Pizarro in 1529 by King Charles I of Spain, of which he was appointed governor.

The region roughly consisted of modern Peru and was, after the foundation of Lima in 1535, divided. The conquest of the Inca empire in 1531–1533, performed by Pizarro and his brothers set the basis for the territorial boundaries of New Castile.

Governorates in Hispanic America
After the territorial division of South America between Spain and Portugal, the Peruvian Hispanic administration was divided into six entities: 
Province of Tierra Firme, included the Caribbean Coast, Central America, the Pacific Coast of Colombia and Mexico.
Governorate of New Castile, consisting of the territories from roughly the Ecuadorian-Colombian border in the north to Cuzco in the south.
Governorate of New Toledo, forming the previous southern half of the Inca empire, stretching towards central Chile.
Governorate of New Andalusia, which was not formally conquered by Spain until decades later.
Governorate of New León, the southernmost part of the continent until the Strait of Magellan.
Governorate of Terra Australis, territories from the south of the Strait of Magellan to the South Pole.

This territorial division set the basis for the Hispanic administration of South America for several decades. It was formally dissolved in 1544, when King Charles I sent his personal envoy, Blasco Núñez Vela, to govern the newly founded Viceroyalty of Peru that replaced the governorates.

See also
List of Viceroys of Peru
Viceroyalty of Peru
Spanish conquest of the Americas
Spanish Empire
Nueva Castilla in the Spanish East Indies

References

 Ushistory.org/civ/11c.asp

Governorates of the Spanish Empire
Colonial Peru
Spanish colonization of the Americas
1520s in Peru
1530s in Peru
1540s in Peru
States and territories established in 1528
1528 establishments in the Spanish Empire
1528 establishments in South America
States and territories disestablished in 1542
1542 disestablishments in the Spanish Empire
1542 disestablishments in South America
1540s in the Viceroyalty of Peru
16th century in the Spanish Empire